This article contains a list of recipients of the title Hero of the Soviet Union who were of Armenian ethnicity.

 Gazaros Avakyan ru
 Grant Avakyan ru
 Hunan Avetisyan
 Temik Avtandylyan ru
 Goga Agamirov ru
 Grigory Ayrapetyan ru
 Armen Ayriev
 Georgy Akopyants ru
 Ruben Akopyan ru
 Ashot Amatuni
 Avak Antinyan ru
 Suren Arakelyan ru
 Guren Arzumanov ru
 Georgy Arustamov ru
 Aydin Arutyunyan ru
 Ashot Asriyan ru
 Eduard Ayanyan ru
 Hamazasp Babadzhanian
 Agvan Babyan ru
 Hmayak Babayan
 Grant Babayan ru
 Semyon Bagdasaryan
 Ruben Bagirov ru
 Ivan Bagramyan
 Grigory Bagyan ru
 Garegin Balayan ru
 Miran Bastandzhyan ru
 Sergey Burnazyan ru
 Vachagan Vantsyan ru
 Garnik Vartumyan ru
 Gevork Vartanyan
 Yervand Garanyan ru
 Sergey Grigoryan ru
 Yeremy Danilyants ru
 Levon Darbinyan ru
 Nshan Darbinyan ru
 Tatevos Yegiazaryan ru
 Eduard Yelyan ru
 Vaginak Zakharyan ru
 Vladimir Ionosyan ru
 Ivan Isakov
 Liparit Israelyan ru
 Ashot Kazaryan ru
 Hamayak Kazaryan ru
 Andranik Kazaryan ru
 Ashkharbek Kazaryan ru
 Grigory Kalustov ru
 Rafail Kaprelyan
 Askanaz Karapetyan ru
 Gurgen Karapetyan ru
 Jahan Karakhanyan ru
 Ashot Kasparov ru
 Suren Kasparyan ru
 Garush Konstantinov ru
 Vayk Levonyan ru
 Ghukas Madoyan
 Isak Manasyan ru
 Akop Manukyan ru
 Sarkis Martirosyan
 Arutyun Meletyan ru
 Khachatur Melikyan ru
 Andrey Melkonyan ru
 Gedeon Mikaelyan ru
 Stepan Mikoyan ru
 Samson Mkrtumov ru
 Arutyun Mkrtchyan ru
 Aleksandr Mnatsakanov ru
 Andranik Muradyan ru
 Aleksandr Murdugov ru
 Martiros Nagulyan ru
 Konstantin Nazarov ru
 Vazgen Oganesov ru
 Grant Oganyants ru
 Mikhail Parsegov
 Suren Petrosyan ru
 Aramais Pogosyan ru
 Apoven Rostomyan ru
 Vardkes Rustamyan ru
 Ishkan Saribekyan ru
 Armais Sarkisov ru
 Fyodor Sarkisov ru
 Vasily Sarkisyan ru
 Suren Sarkisyan ru
 Aram Safarov ru
 Karapet Simonyan ru
 Hamayak Snoplyan ru
 Vladimir Tambiev ru
 Arsen Ter-Oganov ru
 Horen Hachatryan ru
 Arutyun Chakryan ru
 Lazar Chapchakhov ru
 Saribek Chilingaryan ru
 Mikhail Shalzhiyan ru
 Ivan Shaumyan ru
 Vladimir Yavrumov ru
 David Yazydzhan ru

References
 
 
 
 Russian Ministry of Defence Database «Подвиг Народа в Великой Отечественной войне 1941—1945 гг.» [Feat of the People in the Great Patriotic War 1941-1945] (in Russian).

Heroes of the Soviet Union lists